Odontopera is a genus of moths in the family Geometridae described by Stephens in 1831. Aethiopodes is sometimes also included here.

Selected species
Odontopera albiguttulata Bastelberger, 1909
Odontopera bidentata (Clerck, 1759)
Odontopera bilinearia (Swinhoe, 1890)
Odontopera insulata Bastelberger, 1909

References

Ennominae